York and Selby Magistrates’ Court is a Grade II listed building on Clifford Street, York.

History and architecture
The foundation stone for the new Courts of Justice was laid on 16 July 1890 by Prince Albert Victor, Duke of Clarence and Avondale.

The Magistrates’ Court was built between 1890 and 1892 to the designs of the architects Huon Arthur Matear and Henry Bloomfield Bare. The quantity surveyor was Charles Wise of Liverpool and the contract for construction was let to Parker and Sharpe of York. The cost of construction was £17,050.

They were opened on 19 October 1892 by the Lord Mayor of York, John Close who unveiled a bust of the late Duke of Clarence which had be sculpted by Francis John Williamson. The style of the building was a free treatment of Gothic architecture with the main entrance on Clifford Street and a projecting bay at each end carried up to octagonal turrets enriched with carved stonework at a greater height that the remainder of the facade. In the apex of the pediment is carved the arms of the city of York and above them a figure of Justice holding the scales. Behind is a clock tower.

References

Grade II listed buildings in York
Buildings and structures completed in 1892
Magistrates' courts in England and Wales